Patrick Goggles (born August 6, 1952) is a Democratic former member of the Wyoming House of Representatives. He represented the 33rd district from 2005 until 2015.

Family
Patrick is married to his wife Charlotte and together they have 4 children. Patrick and his wife currently live in Ethete, Wyoming.

Religion
Patrick is a traditional Native American.

Education
Patrick attended Central Wyoming College in 1986 and later received his BS in political science from the University of Wyoming in 2001.

Organizations
Patrick is currently a member of Leadership Wyoming Alumni and a member of the Northern Arapaho Tribal Housing POW-WOW Committee.

External links
Wyoming State Legislature - Representative Patrick Goggles official WY Senate website
Project Vote Smart - Representative Patrick Goggles (WY) profile
Follow the Money - Patrick Goggles
2006 2004 campaign contributions

References

1952 births
Central Wyoming College alumni
Living people
Democratic Party members of the Wyoming House of Representatives
Native American state legislators
People from Fremont County, Wyoming
University of Wyoming alumni